Robert Gordon Wilson may refer to:
Gordon Wilson (Scottish politician), (1938–2017), Scottish politician and solicitor
Robert Gordon Wilson (architect) (1844–1931), Scottish architect

See also
Robert Wilson (disambiguation)